Antifaschistische Aktion was a militant anti-fascist organisation in the Weimar Republic started by members of the Communist Party of Germany (KPD) that existed from 1932 to 1933. It was primarily active as a KPD campaign during the July 1932 German federal election and the November 1932 German federal election and was described by the KPD as a "red united front under the leadership of the only anti-fascist party, the KPD."

In the postwar era, the historical organisation inspired new groups and networks, known as the wider antifa movement, many of which use the aesthetics of Antifaschistische Aktion, especially the antifa moniker and a modified version of its logo. During the Cold War, Antifaschistische Aktion had a dual legacy in East Germany and West Germany, respectively. In East Germany, it was considered part of the history and heritage of the KPD's successor, the Socialist Unity Party of Germany. In West Germany, its aesthetics and name were embraced by Maoists and later autonomists from the 1970s.

Background 
The late 1920s and early 1930s saw rising tensions mainly between three broad groups, the Communist Party of Germany (KPD) on one side, the Nazi Party a second, and a coalition of governing parties, mainly social democrats and liberals, making up a third side. Berlin in particular was the site of regular and often very violent clashes. Both the Communists and the Nazis explicitly sought to overthrow the liberal democracy of the Weimar Republic while the social democrats and liberals strongly defended the republic and its constitution. As part of this struggle, all three factions organized their own paramilitary groups.

 Under the leadership of Ernst Thälmann, the KPD became a Stalinist party that was fiercely loyal to the Soviet government. Since 1928, the KPD was largely controlled and funded by the Soviet government through the Comintern. Up until 1928, the KPD pursued a united front policy of working with other working class and socialist parties to combat fascism. It was in this period, in 1924, that the Roter Frontkämpferbund ("Red Front Fighters League"; RFB), the KPD's paramilitary and propaganda organisation and first anti-fascist front, had been formed. The RFB was often involved in violent clashes with the police.

However, after The Communist International's abrupt ultra-left turn in its Third Period from 1928, the KPD regarded the Social Democratic Party of Germany (SPD) as its main adversary and adopted the position that the SPD was the main fascist party in Germany. This was based on the theory of social fascism that had been proclaimed by Joseph Stalin and that was supported by the Comintern during the late 1920s and early 1930s, which held that social democracy was a variant of fascism. Consequently, the KPD held that it was "the only anti-fascist party" in Germany and stated that "fighting fascism means fighting the SPD just as much as it means fighting Hitler and the parties of Brüning." In KPD and Soviet usage, fascism was primarily viewed as the final stage of capitalism rather than a specific group or movement such as the Italian Fascists or the German Nazis and, based on this theory, the term was applied quite broadly.

In 1929, the KPD's banned public May Day rally in Berlin was broken up by police; 33 people were killed in the clash and subsequent rioting. The RFB was then banned as extremist by the governing Social Democrats. In late 1931, local Roter Massenselbstschutz ("Red Mass Self-Defence") units were formed by Kampfbund members as autonomous and loosely organized structures under the leadership of, but outside the formal organization of the KPD as part of the party's united front policy to work with other working class groups to defeat "fascism" as interpreted by the party.

During the Third Period, the KPD viewed the Nazi Party ambiguously. On one hand, the KPD considered the Nazi Party to be one of the fascist parties. On the other hand, the KPD sought to appeal to the Strasserite-wing of the Nazi movement by using nationalist slogans. The KPD sometimes cooperated with the Nazis in attacking the SPD. In 1931, the KPD had united with the Nazis, whom they referred to as "working people's comrades", in an unsuccessful attempt to bring down the SPD state government of Prussia by means of a referendum. In the usage of the Soviet Union, and of the Comintern and its affiliated parties in this period, including the KPD, the epithet fascist was used to describe capitalist society in general and virtually any anti-Soviet or anti-Stalinist activity or opinion.

The formation of Antifaschistische Aktion in 1932 indicated a shift away from the Third Period policies, as fascism came to be recognised as a more serious threat (the two red flags on its logo symbolized Communists in unity with socialists), leading up to the 1934 and 1935 adoption of a popular front policy of anti-fascist unity with non-Communist groups. In October 1931, a coalition of right-wing and far-right parties established the Harzburg Front, which opposed the government of the Centre Party's Heinrich Brüning. In response, the SPD and affiliated group established the Iron Front to defend liberal democracy and the constitution of the Weimar Republic. Antifaschistische Aktion was formed partly as a counter-move to the SPD's establishment of the Iron Front, which the KPD regarded as a "social fascist terror organisation." However, from the mid-1930s, the term anti-fascist became ubiquitous in Soviet, Comintern, and KPD usage, as Communists who had been attacking democratic rivals were now told to change tack and engage in coalitions with them against the fascist threat.

Establishment 

After a brawl in the Landtag of Prussia between members of the Nazi Party and the KPD left eight people severely injured, the KPD under Thälmann's leadership reacted to the establishment of the Harzburg Front and the Iron Front with a call for their own Unity Front which they shortly after renamed Antifaschistische Aktion.

The KPD formally announced the establishment of Antifaschistische Aktion in the party's newspaper Die Rote Fahne (The Red Flag) on 26 May 1932. The new organisation was based on the principle of a communist front, but it remained an integral part of the KPD. The KPD described Antifaschistische Aktion as a "red united front under the leadership of the only anti-fascist party, the KPD." 

The organisation held its first rally in Berlin on 10 July 1932, then capital of the Weimar Republic.

How many people belonged to Antifaschistische Aktion is difficult to determine because there were no membership cards. Rather, it developed out of the practical participation. The Red Mass Self-Defense (RMSS) units were absorbed into Antifaschistische Aktion, forming the nuclei of the latter's Unity Committees, organised on a micro-local basis, e.g. in apartment buildings, factories or allotments. As well as being involved in political streetfights, the RMSS and Antifaschistische Aktion used their militant approach to develop a comprehensive network of self-defence for communities targeted by the Nazis such as in "tenant protection" (Mieterschutz), action against evictions. Initially, the RMSS units had minimal formal membership, but in the second half of 1932 local executive boards were created to co-ordinate the activities of the KPD, the Kampfbund, the RMSS and the now illegal Roter Frontkämpferbund, with the RMSS given a more distinct and almost paramilitary defence role, often co-operating on an ad hoc basis with the Reichsbanner.

With Antifaschistische Aktion, the KPD not only wanted to create a cross-party collection movement dominated by KPD, but they also aimed specifically at the Reichstag election on 31 July 1932. The election campaign for the July election is regarded as the most violent in German history. In particular between KPD and Nazi supporters, it came to massive clashes and even shootings. After the forced dissolution in the wake of the Machtergreifung in 1933, the movement went underground.

Legacy 

In the postwar era, the historical Antifaschistische Aktion inspired a variety of different movements, groups and individuals in Germany as well as other countries which widely adopted variants of its aesthetics and some of its tactics. Known as the wider antifa movement, modern antifa groups have no direct organisational connection to Antifaschistische Aktion. Groups called Antifaschistische Aktion, Antifaschistische Ausschüsse, or Antifaschistische Kommittees, all typically abbreviated to antifa, spontaneously re-emerged in Germany in 1944, mainly involving veterans of the pre-war KPD, KPO, and SPD.
 Some members of other democratic political parties and Christians who opposed the Nazi régime also participated. In 1945, the anti-fascist committee in the city of Olbernhau included "three Communists and three Social Democrats" while the antifascist committee in Leipzig "had nine members, including three liberals and progressive Christians."

In the American, British, and French zones, antifa groups began to recede by the late summer of 1945, marginalized by Allied bans on political organization and by re-emerging divisions within the movement between Communists and others. In East Germany, antifa groups were absorbed into the new Stalinist state. On 11 July 1945, the Soviets permitted the formation of the United Front of the Antifascist-Democratic Parties which included representatives from the "Communist KPD, the Social Democratic SPD, the Christian Democratic Union (CDU), and the Liberal Democratic Party (LDP)."

In the United States, antifa of the early 21st-century has drawn its aesthetics and some of its tactics from Antifaschistische Aktion.

See also 
 Anti-Germans (political current)
 German resistance to Nazism
 Conny Wessmann

References

Further reading 
 Autonome Antifa (M) (April 1995). "Die Geschichte der Antifaschistischen Aktion" . Antifaschistischen Aktion/Bundesweite Organisation.
 Karl, Heinz; Kücklich, Erika, eds. (1965). Die Antifaschistische Aktion. Dokumentation und Chronik, Mai 1932 Bis Januar 1933 . Berlin: Dietz.
 Knütter, Hans-Helmuth (2010). Antifaschismus: der geistige Bürgerkrieg . Foreword by Heinrich Lummer. Hamburg: Die Dt. Konservativen e.V.
 Lein, Albrecht (1978). "Antifaschistischen Komitees nach 1945". Antifaschistische Aktion 1945: d. "Stunde Null" in Braunschweig. Musterschmidt. .
 Michelmann, Jeannette. Die Aktivisten der ersten Stunde: Die Antifa 1945 in der sowjetischen Besatzungszone zwischen Besatzungsmacht und Exil-KPD . Vorgelegt dem Rat der Philosophischen Fakultät der Friedrich-Schiller-Universität Jena.
 Moreau, Patrick (1996). Linksextremismus: eine unterschätzte Gefahr . With Jürgen P. Lang. Bonn.

External links 
 Antifaschistische Aktion – Germany .
 Autonomen Antifa [M .

1932 establishments in Germany
Anti-fascist organisations in Germany
Communist Party of Germany
Organizations established in 1932